FC Nara-ShBFR Naro-Fominsk is an association football club from Naro-Fominsk, Russia, founded in 1994. It played in the Russian Second Division (zone West) in 2005–2010. The team was called in the past Shelkovik Naro-Fominsk (1994–2004) and Nara-Desna Naro-Fominsk (2005–2007). Another Naro-Fominsk team, Trud Naro-Fominsk, played professionally in 1968 and 1969. ShBFR stands for "Школа Бразильского Футбола России" (Russian School of Brazilian Football).

Association football clubs established in 1994
Football clubs in Russia
Football in Moscow Oblast
Defunct football clubs in Russia
1994 establishments in Russia
2011 disestablishments in Russia
Association football clubs disestablished in 2011